Australian Better Families was a political party registered on 31 August 2018. The Party's founder is Leith Erikson and has the slogan “Better Families for a Better Australia”. Australian Better Families campaign targets new and existing laws in the areas of mental health, child support and family law. Australian Better Families promotes the rights of father's in the legal system, particularly stressing the trauma caused by separation from family during legal proceedings. The party is a branch of the Australian Brotherhood of Fathers organisation, who stated they created the party as they "can no longer sit silently on the political sidelines to witness the betrayal of our children and families."

Australian Better Families has been linked to Pauline Hanson's One Nation political party by contact between Leith Erikson, the Australian Brotherhood of Fathers and One Nation figures.

Australian Better Families was de-registered as a political party by Australian Electoral Commission on 13 October 2021 for failing to have 500 members.

History 
The Australian Better Families party was established in 2018 as the political arm of the ‘Australian Brotherhood of Fathers’. The party's founder, Leith Erikson, is a men's rights activist. The party has proposed a "Minister for Men" to complement the existing Minister for Women.

Leith Erikson started the #21fathers movement, named for the discredited claim that 21 men commit suicide each week because of family law issues such as child support and domestic violence orders. The Australian Brotherhood of Fathers campaign is based on anecdotal evidence from men's rights advocates Barry Williams and Sue Price. They state that between three and five fathers are committing suicide daily due to the emotional trauma of family separation, and twenty-one fathers commit suicide weekly. The campaign has been criticised for making unsubstantiated claims as national suicide statistics do not disclose whether men committing suicide have been fathers or not.

Fathers' rights groups advocate for fathers who feel let-down by the legal system. The Australian Brotherhood of Fathers has promoted a range of public awareness campaigns focusing on issues facing some parents, particularly fathers. The fathers’ rights movement can be traced to the 19th century, but the last thirty years have seen an increase in the movement's activities. The popularity of men's rights groups has been encouraged by an increase in female activism and a shift from traditional parental roles towards female education and employment.

The Men's rights movement and the Fathers' rights movement argue the existence of unrecognised injustice for men. The movement consists of men and women concerned with discrimination in the legal system, particularly in the areas of divorce and child custody. The men's rights movement argues that a feminist agenda overstates the role of men in the oppression of women and consequently worsens the lives of men. The men's rights movement denies the feminist claim that men have access to more privileges than women.

Australian Better Families has received media commentary for its alignment with the men's rights ideology. The party has been targeted for its rejection of domestic violence as a gendered issue and discouragement of men from consenting to domestic violence orders. The party also received backlash for promoting policy change during a protest on the Gold Coast hosted on International Women's Day 2017. Leith Erikson was quoted alleging that the “gender pay gap is a lie” and that “if women are not in top positions in business or government, it's based on their ability to be there.”

Candidates 
The Australia Better Families Party nominated candidates for the 2019 Australian federal election in the following areas:
 Senate candidates for New South Wales: Jewell Drury and Peter Moujalli
 Senate candidates for Queensland: Darren Caulfield, Adam Finch and Rod Fox
 Senate candidate for Tasmania: Greg Beck
 Division of Greenway candidate: Graham McFarland

Ideologies and policies 
The Australian Better Families advocates policy reform in the sectors of mental health, child support and family law. These policies have long sparked debate that has led to the growth and spread of the men's rights movement.

The Australian Better Families party cites the amendment of domestic violence legislation as a core administrative target. Pauline Hanson is deputy chair in the ongoing inquiry into the Australian Family Law system. Pauline Hanson's One Nation party has been linked to Australian Better Families and Australian Brotherhood of Fathers through the hosting of events purposed to raise domestic violence awareness, and through social media contact between Leith Erikson and One Nation party members. One Nation has proposed new domestic violence policy, including a change to the laws that categorically restrict a father's visitation rights after a court awards an emergency protection order. This policy has been partly credited to input from the Australian Brotherhood of Fathers. In 2020, the Australian Brotherhood of Fathers submitted the idea of a low-risk domestic violence category to Senate. The inquiry has targeted the issue of women filing false domestic violence claims, which is also a focus of the Australian Brotherhood of Fathers. The Brotherhood have advocated a series of public awareness campaigns attempting to shed light on this issue in the modern legal system, including #donotconsent and #notyourright. #donotconsent campaign encouraged individuals served with a notice to appear in court to answer a Domestic Violence Order, Apprehended Violence Order, Violence Restraining Order or an Instant Offense, to refuse to consent to the order without the matter going to trial. #notyourright emphasises the financial and emotional burden on parents when access to children is limited by abuse allegations and child support payments.

Australian Better Families have publicised the matter of domestic violence committed against male victims. The domestic violence system in Australia is criticised for being biased towards female victims by the Australian Better Families Party social media and in the party constitution. Family Law changes are among the party's reform proposals; the party advocates zero tolerance to family and domestic violence, emphasising the inclusion of male victims. Leith Erikson is a board member of End all Domestic Violence (Endalldv); a small charity based in Robina Queensland that offers services across Australia. The charity provides services and support to domestic violence victims of all ages, gender and sexualities.

The introduction of a Minister for Men in Australia has been scheduled as a target by the Australian Better Families party. Pauline Hanson has also expressed support for an Australian Minister for Men, submitting in a press release that "the plight of Australian boys and men is on the decline". The proposed Minister for Men would be responsible for ensuring that national male health and education programs are maintained with a dedicated ministerial portfolio for men. Australian Better Families intend this as a complement to the existing Minister for Women, who has historically championed subjects of female empowerment.

Social media posts and statements by Australian Better Families have criticised the handling of the COVID-19 pandemic by the Australian government. In these posts Coronavirus is referred to as 'Chinese Virus' and many mock the government action as disorganised in policy responses. Support for the #AllLivesMatter movement has also been shown in public postings through hashtags. The party published a Facebook post scrutinising the government for allowing Black Lives Matter protests in Melbourne which they deemed as partly responsible for the growing Coronavirus case figures in July 2020.

Links to other groups 

Leith Erikson is the founder of Australian Better Families and has been publicly connected to Pauline Hanson's One Nation Senator Malcolm Roberts, One Nation past Leader Steve Dickson and the One Nation party more broadly. The Australian Brotherhood of Fathers has publicly clashed with Liberal MP Ros Bates and the Electrical Trades Union.

 The Australian Brotherhood of Fathers hosted a barbecue that was funded by the One Nation party in November 2017. The barbecue was officially hosted by Malcolm Roberts, an Ipswich political candidate for One Nation. The Australian Brotherhood of Father's and #endallDV were running the sausage sizzle. Queensland Council of Union members were present to voice concerns for the rights and safety of women and children in One Nation's domestic violence laws. 
The Electrical Trades Union also opposed the barbecue and posed questions to Malcolm Roberts regarding political issues such as domestic violence and weekend penalty rates. Roberts ignored the questions; however, his supporters could be seen yelling at the Union's organiser Stuart Trail. Trail was quoted after the event saying; "A bloke started abusing me and calling me a pedophile". 
 In a Facebook video, Leith Erikson has claimed that the Australian Brotherhood of Fathers "produced policy" with One Nation in 2017 "to level the playing field and make domestic violence policy gender-neutral".
Public alignment with Pauline Hanson's One Nation Party has been made in social media postings by the Australian Better Families party and the Australian Brotherhood of Fathers. In these posts, the groups have advocated actions and speeches made by One Nation members Senator Pauline Hanson and Senator Malcolm Roberts.
 In April 2017, Blokes Advice met with representatives of One Nation. Blokes Advice is a closed Facebook group that has been shut down in the past after allegations of glorifying rape and violence against women. The group admin have publicly acknowledged that they have agreed to allow the Australian Brotherhood of Father's to use the page as "an advertising avenue".
 A Facebook live video filmed in March 2018 was released showing Senator Malcolm Roberts, Steve Dickson and Leith Erikson alleging that individuals are made to become violent by the poor family law system. This commentary was then admonished by Law Council of Australia president Arthur Moses SC. Arthur Moses described the comments as "irresponsible and plain stupid" due to their capacity to encourage violence in individuals who are currently or were previously involved in legal proceedings. Following this, Arthur Moses SC recommended all politicians undergo domestic violence awareness training on account of the ongoing family law inquiry.
 The Australian Brotherhood of Fathers were accused of harassing Liberal MP Ros Bates in 2017. In parliament, she has described the group as "a group of men who harass women, promote suicide and use fake statistics, all to drive their own warped agenda". Bates has specifically condemned One Nation domestic violence law and alleged Steve Dickson was influenced by the Australian Brotherhood of Father's in policy reform - "brainwashed by a few jilted men caught up in custody battles".

References

External links

Defunct political parties in Australia
Political parties established in 2018
2018 establishments in Australia